Blackmore End may refer to one of these places in England:
Blackmore End, Essex, a hamlet near Braintree in the civil parish of Wethersfield.
Blackmore End, Hertfordshire, a settlement near St Albans
Blackmore End, Worcestershire, a location